The Borzontul Mare (sometimes referred to as Borzont) is a left tributary of the river Mureș in Romania. It discharges into the Mureș near Joseni. The upper reach of the river is also known as Putna.

References

Rivers of Romania
Rivers of Harghita County